Rizvan Ablitarov (born 18 April 1989 in Shahrisabz, Uzbek SSR) is a professional Ukrainian football defender of Crimean Tatar descent who plays for Zhetysu.

Career

Club
Ablitarov is product of the UOR Simferopol youth system.

On 15 January 2020, Ablitarov signed for FC Kaisar. In 2021, he signed for Zhetysu.

Honours
Sevastopol
 Ukrainian First League: 2012–13

References

External links 
 
Profile on Official Dnipro Website

1989 births
Living people
People from Shahrisabz
Ukrainian people of Crimean Tatar descent
Crimean Tatar sportspeople
Ukrainian footballers
FC Dnipro players
FC Sevastopol-2 players
FC Bukovyna Chernivtsi players
FC Tytan Armyansk players
FC Daugava players
Ukrainian expatriate footballers
Expatriate footballers in Latvia
FC Obolon-Brovar Kyiv players
FC Chornomorets Odesa players
Ukrainian Premier League players
Expatriate footballers in Kazakhstan
FC Atyrau players
Ukrainian expatriate sportspeople in Latvia
Ukrainian expatriate sportspeople in Kazakhstan
Association football defenders
FC Olimpik Donetsk players
FC Zhetysu players
Ukraine youth international footballers